is a Japanese actor and voice actor from Tokyo. He is affiliated with Theater Echo, and is skilled in Buyō.

Roles

Television animation
Ippotsu Kanta-kun (Kōzan)
Legendary Giant God Ideon (Gije Zaral)
Pokémon (Russell)
Space Battleship Yamato II (Yasuo Nanbu)
Space Battleship Yamato III (Yasuo Nanbu)
Stellvia of the Universe (Tamotsu Kazamatsuri)
Cardcaptor Sakura (Clow Reed)
Saint Seiya (Hound Asterion)

OVA
Legend of the Galactic Heroes (Horst Sinzer)

Dubbing roles
Armageddon (Rockhound (Steve Buscemi))
Prison Break (Brad Bellick)
West Side Story (1979 TBS edition) (Loco (Jaime Rogers))

Tokusatsu
 Kamen Rider Amazon (Spider Beastman (ep. 1), Snake Beastman (ep. 7), Diving Beetle Beastman (ep. 16))
 Kamen Rider Stronger (Kikkaijin Hasamigani(ep. 24) )
 Choudenshi Bioman (Bio Hunter Silva (ep. 37 - 49))
 Gekisou Sentai Carranger (SS Pamaan (ep. 24)/Zoku Red (ep. 24))
 Seijuu Sentai Gingaman (Sword General Budoh (eps. 1 - 24))
 Kyuukyuu Sentai GoGo-V (Computer Psyma Beast Cybergildo (ep. 14) )

Japanese Voice-Over
Peter Pan's Flight (Nana)

References

External links
Theater Echo profile
 

1945 births
Japanese male voice actors
Living people
People from Tokyo